T-box transcription factor 2 Tbx2 is a transcription factor that is encoded by the Tbx2 gene on chromosome 17q21-22 in humans.  This gene is a member of a phylogenetically conserved family of genes that share a common DNA-binding domain, the T-box.  Tbx2 and Tbx3 are the only T-box transcription factors that act as transcriptional repressors rather than transcriptional activators, and are closely related in terms of development and tumorigenesis.  This gene plays a significant role in embryonic and fetal development through control of gene expression, and also has implications in various cancers.  Tbx2 is associated with numerous signaling pathways, BMP, TGFβ, Wnt, and FGF, which allow for patterning and proliferation during organogenesis in fetal development.

Role in development 
The molecule Tbx-2 is a transcription factor in the T box transcription factor family. Tbx2 helps form the outflow tract and atrioventricular canal. Tbx2 can repress genes as well as being competitors that take over binding sites. It also plays a role in cancer because it will suppress cell growth and supports invasiveness. In human melanoma, the expression of endogenous Tbx 2 is shown to help reduce the growth of melanomas. It has also been shown that overexpression of Tbx2 can lead to breast cancer. Tbx2 has shown septal defects of the outflow tract, and this has been shown using a knockout mouse. The knockout mouse is a mouse in which the gene is inactivated in order to study the role of genes. Tbx 2 also helps in regulating the cell cycle. This was first shown when Tbx2 was found in a chromosomal region that is often mutated in ovarian cancer and pancreatic cancer cells.

During fetal development, the relationship of Tbx2 to FGF, BMP, and Wnt signaling pathways indicates its extensive control in development of various organ systems.  It functions predominantly in the patterning of organ development rather than tissue proliferation. Tbx2 has implications in limb development, atrioventricular development of the heart, and development of the anterior brain tissues.

During limb bud development, Shh and FGF signaling stimulate the outgrowth of the limb.  At a certain point, Tbx2 concentrations are such that the signaling of Shh and FGF are terminated, halting further progression and outgrowth of the limb development.  This occurs directly through Tbx2 repressing the expression of Grem1, creating a negative Grem1 zone, thereby disrupting the outgrowth signaling by Shh and FGF.

Cardiac development is heavily regulated and requires the development of the four cardiac chambers, septum, and various valve components for outflow and inflow.  In heart development, Tbx2 is up-regulated by BMP2 to stimulate atrioventricular development.  The development of a Tbx2 knockout mouse model allowed for the determination of specific roles of Tbx2 in cardiac development, and scientists determined Tbx2 and Tbx3 to be redundant in much of heart development.  Further, the use of these knockout models determined the significance of Tbx2 in the BMP signaling pathway for development of the atrioventricular canal, atrioventricular nodal phenotype, and atrioventricular cushion.

The atrioventricular canal signaling cascade involves the atrial natriuretic factor gene (ANF). This gene is one of the first hallmarks of chamber formation in the developing myocardium. A small fragment within this gene can repress the promoter of cardiac troponin I (cTnI) selectively in the atrioventricular canal. T-box factor and NK2-homeobox factor binding element are involved in the repression of the atrioventricular canal without affecting its chamber activity. Tbx2 forms a complex with Nkx2.5 on the ANF gene to repress its promoter activity, so that the gene's expression is inhibited in the atrioventricular canal during chamber differentiation. The atrioventricular canal is also the origin of the atrioventricular nodal axis and helps eventually coordinate the beating heart. The role of Tbx2 in cushion formation in the developing heart is by working with Tbx3 to trigger a feed-forward loop with BMP2 for the coordinated development of these cushions. Tbx2 has also been found to temporally suppress the proliferation and differentiation a subset of the primary myocardial cells.

Finally, during anterior brain development, BMP stimulates the expression of Tbx2, which suppresses FGF signaling.  This suppression of FGF signaling further represses the expression of Flrt3, which is necessary for anterior brain development.

Tbx2 has been shown to be a master regulator in the differentiation of inner and outer hair cells.

Associated congenital defects 

It is known that Tbx2 functions in a dose-dependent manner; therefore, duplication or deletion of the region encompassing Tbx2 can cause various congenital defects, including: microcephaly, various ventricular-septal defects, and skeletal abnormalities.  Some specific abnormalities are discussed further below. Mutations in TBX2 cause predisposition to hernias.

Abnormalities of the digits 

During limb bud development, down-regulation of Tbx2 fails to inhibit Shh/FGF4 signaling; therefore, resulting in increased limb bud size and duplication of the 4th digit, polydactyly.  Opposite this, when Tbx2 is over expressed or duplicated, limb buds are smaller and can have reduced digit number because of the early termination of Shh and FGF4 signaling.

Ventricular septal defects 

This is a broad category encompassing many more specific congenital heart defects.  Of those related to Tbx2, some are caused by duplication, or over expression, of Tbx2, and others are caused by deletion of the Tbx2 gene region.  For example, patients with a duplication of the Tbx2 gene region have presented with atrioventricular abnormalities including: interventricular septal defect, patent foramen ovale, aortic coarctation, tricuspid valve insufficiency, and mitral valve stenosis.  Contrary, those with Tbx2 gene deletion have presented with pulmonary hypertension and other heart defects, but is less reported.

Role in tumorigenesis 

Tbx2 has been implicated in cancers associated with the lung, breast, bone, pancreas, and melanoma.  It is known to be over-expressed in this group of cancers, altering cell-signaling pathways leading to tumorigenesis.  Several pathways have been suggested and studied using mouse knockout models of genes within the signaling pathways.  Currently, research using the knockout model of Tbx2 for study of tumorigenesis is limited.

p14ARF/MDM2/p35/p21CIP1 Pathway.  When up-regulated, Tbx2 inhibits p21CIP1.  p21CIP1 is necessary for tissue senescence, and when compromised, leaves the tissue vulnerable to tumor-promoting signals.

Wnt/beta-catenin Pathway.  The role of Tbx2 in Wnt signaling has yet to be confirmed; however, up-regulation of Tbx2 in the beta-catenin signaling pathway leads to loss of the adhesion molecule E-cadherin.  This returns cells to a mesenchymal state, and facilitates invasion of tumor cells.

EGR1 Signaling Pathway.  Finally, Tbx2 up-regulation increases its interaction with EGR1.  EGR1 represses NDGR1 to increase cell proliferation, resulting in metastasis or tumor development.

Together, the up-regulation of Tbx2 on these signaling pathways can lead to development of malignant tumors.

Cancer treatment target 
Understanding the signaling pathways, and the role of Tbx2 in tumorigenesis, can aid in developing gene-targeted cancer treatments.  Because Tbx2 is up-regulated in various types of cancer cells in multiple organ systems, the potential for gene therapy is optimistic.  Scientists are interested in targeting a small domain of Tbx2 and Tbx3 to reduce its expression, and utilize small peptides known to suppress tumor genes to inhibit proliferation.  An in vitro study using a cell line of human prostate cancer blocked endogenous Tbx2 using Tbx2 dominant-negative retroviral vectors found reduced tumor cell proliferation.  Further, the same study suggests targeting WNT3A because of its role in cell-signaling with Tbx2, by utilizing a WNT antagonist such as SFRP-2.  Because somatic cells have low expression of Tbx2, a targeted Tbx2 gene treatment would leave healthy somatic cells unharmed, thereby providing a treatment with low toxicity and negative side effects.  Much research is still required to determine the efficacy of these specific gene targets to anti-cancer treatments.

References

Further reading

External links 
 

Transcription factors